Den tänkande brevbäraren ("The Thinking Postman") was the Sveriges Television's Christmas calendar and Sveriges Radio's Christmas Calendar in 1963. The radio version was called Brevbäraren vid Radiogränd ("The Postman at Radio Alley").

Plot 
Kalle works as a postman. When there's time enough, he talks with the people living in the districts where he works.

References

External links 
 

Sveriges Radio's Christmas Calendar
1963 radio programme debuts
1963 radio programme endings
Radio programs adapted into television shows
1963 Swedish television series debuts
1963 Swedish television series endings
Fictional postal workers
Sveriges Television's Christmas calendar
Television shows set in Sweden